Sam Warburg (born April 29, 1983) is an American retired tennis player.

College career 
Warburg was a 4-time All-American for Stanford University, and won the NCAA Doubles Championship in 2004 while partnered with KC Corkery.  He also won the 2004 & 2005 PAC-10 Singles titles.

Professional career 
Warburg turned pro after graduating from Stanford in 2005. He broke into the top 200 late in 2006.

Warburg spent most of 2007 & 2008 ranked in the top-200 in the world, reaching a high of #132 in May 2008.
He also reached a high doubles ranking of #117 in November 2007.
In 2009, he retired, citing a lack of excitement for the game, and the wear and tear the travel was having on his life.

Performance timeline

Singles

ATP Challenger and ITF Futures finals

Singles: 13 (6–7)

Doubles: 20 (12–8)

References

External links 
 

 Warburg World Ranking History

1983 births
Living people
American male tennis players
Sportspeople from Sacramento, California
Stanford Cardinal men's tennis players
Tennis people from California